Deropeltis is a genus of cockroaches in the family Blattidae also known as hunchback roaches.

References 

Cockroaches
Cockroach genera